The International Cablemakers Federation (ICF) was founded in 1990 with a permanent Secretariat in Vienna, Austria. Today ICF has more than 100 members from more than 30 countries of all regions in the world. The membership represents approx. 70% of the global manufacturing capacity of the Wire & Cable Industry.

 
The objectives defined by the constitution include, amongst others:

 the promotion of the use of cables
 the promotion of energy saving and increased safety
 the improvement of the recovery and re-use of cable materials
 the analysis and collation of statistical data of interest to the industry
 the maintenance of world wide relationships within the Wire & Cable Industry whilst complying with all antitrust and cartel prohibition legislation, applicable to any of the members.

ICF publishes a quarterly Newsletter covering selected topics and industry statistics.

See also 
 Official Website: www.icf.at
 Integer Research
 Europacable
  The Wire Association International (WAI)
 Stewart Hay - Very useful links worldwide

International organisations based in Austria
Wire and cable manufacturers